Long Lake is an unincorporated community in Anderson County, in the U.S. state of Texas. It is located within the Palestine, Texas micropolitan area.

History
Long Lake was supposedly named for the nearby Long Lake, and was originally part of a large  plantation that was purchased by Hugo Monnig in 1911. Even though this plantation developed the production of cotton, it became a trading and shipping port for agriculture in the surrounding area, since it was located on a former International-Great Northern Railroad. A man named A.L. Bowers unsuccessfully drilled many wells in the settlement in 1913 and several oil and gas wells created a profit that developed in the nearby lake's oilfield and the nearby Tucker by the Tidewater and Texas Seaboard Oil Company in 1932 and 1933. This field was thought to have been the largest in East Texas in the 1930s. It had five businesses and 125 inhabitants in 1939. There was a temporary oil boom that occurred in the community and had an estimated population of 40 from 1949 to 1966. Several scattered houses and a church were located in Long Lake in 1982, with the church standing about half a mile east of the community. The oilfields to the north of the community continued to operate in 1985.

Geography

Education
Long Lake had its own school in 1939 as well as a school called Green Bay High School in 1982. Today the community is served by the Westwood Independent School District.

References

Unincorporated communities in Anderson County, Texas
Unincorporated communities in Texas